Khao Kradong Railway is a brief railway line in the town of Buriram. It runs from Buriram Railway Station to the rock mine which is next to New I-Mobile Stadium.

There are only freight trains run on the lines, once or twice a year. Latest trains enter into the line in January 2014.

See also 
 Buriram Railway Station
 Ubon Ratchathani Main Line

External links 
  Rotfaithai.com #1
  Rotfaithai.com #2

Railway lines in Thailand
Transport in Buriram